The England cricket team were scheduled to tour Pakistan in October 2021 to play two Twenty20 International (T20I) matches. The matches were planned to be played in Rawalpindi, with both teams using them as their preparations for the 2021 ICC Men's T20 World Cup. England last toured Pakistan in 2005. The T20I fixtures were scheduled to be played as double-header matches alongside the England women's games against Pakistan. In August 2021, the Pakistan Cricket Board (PCB) made a minor change to the tour itinerary, moving the matches from the National Stadium in Karachi to the Rawalpindi Cricket Stadium due to logistical reasons. 

On 17 September 2021, the England and Wales Cricket Board (ECB) said they would determine in the next 24 to 48 hours whether they will proceed with the tour or not, after New Zealand cancelled their tour of Pakistan due to a security threat. On 20 September, the ECB announced that the series had been cancelled, citing issues around wellbeing and concerns of travelling to the region. The Pakistan Cricket Board (PCB) Chairman Ramiz Raja expressed his disappointment on Twitter and criticised England for "failing a member of their cricket fraternity".

Squads

Usman Qadir, Shahnawaz Dahani and Fakhar Zaman were named as travelling reserves in Pakistan's squad.

T20I series

1st T20I

2nd T20I

References

External links
 Series home at ESPN Cricinfo

2021 in English cricket
2021 in Pakistani cricket
International cricket competitions in 2021–22
English cricket tours of Pakistan
Cancelled cricket competitions